Charles Emerson Hovey (10 January 1885 – 24 September 1911) was an officer in the United States Navy during the Philippine–American War. He wrote the first edition of the Watch Officer's Manual, published in 1911 and kept in print in subsequent revisions into the 21st century by the United States Naval Institute.

Born in Portsmouth, New Hampshire, Ensign Hovey graduated from the United States Naval Academy in 1907. While in charge of a shore party on the island of Basilan, Ensign Hovey was killed by gunshot when attacked by natives on 24 September 1911.

 was named for him. Veterans of Foreign Wars post #168 in Portsmouth, New Hampshire, is named for him as Emerson Hovey. There is some irony in this - the Philippine conflict was not classified as a "foreign war" at the time of his death, since the Philippines was then a U.S. colony. There is a fountain in Portsmouth's waterfront Prescott Park honoring him.

References 

1885 births
1911 deaths
Writers from Portsmouth, New Hampshire
United States Navy officers
United States Naval Academy alumni
American military personnel killed in the Philippine–American War